Vincenzo de Corbis (died) was a Roman Catholic prelate who served as Bishop of Acerra (1511–1512).

On 22 August 1511, Vincenzo de Corbis was appointed during the papacy of Pope Julius II as Bishop of Acerra.
He served as Bishop of Acerra until his death in 1512.

References

External links and additional sources
 (for Chronology of Bishops) 
 (for Chronology of Bishops) 

16th-century Italian Roman Catholic bishops
Bishops appointed by Pope Julius II
1512 deaths